The imperial election of 1208 was an imperial election held to select the emperor of the Holy Roman Empire.  It took place in Frankfurt on November 11.

As a result of the election, Otto IV was unanimously named Holy Roman Emperor.

References

1208
1208 in the Holy Roman Empire
13th-century elections
Non-partisan elections
Otto IV, Holy Roman Emperor